The 2018–19 Danish 1st Division season is the 23rd season of the Danish 1st Division league championship, governed by the Danish Football Association.

The division-champion will be promoted to the 2019–20 Danish Superliga, while the runners-up and the third placed team will face promotion playoffs.  The teams in 11th and 12th places are relegated to the 2019–20 Danish 2nd Divisions.

Participants
FC Helsingør finished last in the 2017–18 Danish Superliga relegation play-off and were relegated to the 1st Division after only one season in the first tier. Silkeborg IF lost to Esbjerg fB and Lyngby Boldklub lost to Vendsyssel FF in the relegation play off and were relegated as well. Vejle Boldklub, Esbjerg fB and Vendsyssel FF were promoted to the 2018–19 Danish Superliga.

Brabrand IF and Skive IK were relegated to the 2018–19 Danish 2nd Divisions. Brabrand IF was relegated immediately after just one season at the second tier while Skive IK lasted four seasons in the league. Hvidovre IF and Næstved Boldklub won promotion from the 2017–18 Danish 2nd Divisions. Hvidovre will play at the 1st Division for the first time since 2013–14 season, where as Næstved won promotion after only one season's absence.

Stadia and locations

Personnel and sponsoring 
Note: Flags indicate national team as has been defined under FIFA eligibility rules. Players and Managers may hold more than one non-FIFA nationality.

Managerial changes

League table

Play-offs

Relegation play-offs
Matches

Horsens won 2–1 on aggregate.

Hobro won 2–1 on aggregate.

Promotion play-offs
Matches

Lyngby won 4–3 on aggregate and promoted to 2019–20 Danish Superliga

Hobro won 3–0 on aggregate and stayed in the Danish Superliga

Top goalscorers

Notes

References

External links
  Danish FA

2018–19 in Danish football
Danish 1st Division
Danish 1st Division seasons